Carlos Rocha (born 4 December 1974 in Portugal) is a Portuguese retired footballer.

Career
Rocha played college soccer for the Southern Connecticut Fighting Owls between 1994 and 1996, where he is in the top 20 all-time assists list.

Rocha signed for Rhode Island Stingrays in the American third division, scoring 24 league goals before joining American top flight side New England Revolution, where he failed to score in 17 league appearances.

From another American third division team, Boston Bulldogs, where he scored 10 goals in 17 league appearances, Rocha signed for Bury in the English third division. Following Bury, he signed for Irish outfit Kilkenny City.

References

External links
 Carlos Rocha at SoccerStats.us

Portuguese footballers
Living people
Association football forwards
1974 births
New England Revolution players
Boston Bulldogs (soccer) players
Bury F.C. players
Connecticut Wolves players
Rhode Island Stingrays players
Expatriate association footballers in the Republic of Ireland
League of Ireland players
Kilkenny City A.F.C. players